Daniel "Dan" McLay (born 3 January 1992) is a British racing cyclist, competing in road, track and cyclo-cross, who currently rides for UCI ProTeam . His first season as a professional was 2015, racing for French pro-continental and 2014 Tour de France wildcard outfit . Primarily a sprinter, McLay is also competent in the Flemish racing scene and has a particular affinity to the Northern Classics. He was named in the start list for the 2016 Tour de France.

Career

Junior career
Born in Wellington, New Zealand, McLay moved to the United Kingdom as an infant and was brought up in Leicester. McLay began cycling competitively at the age of six. Following his success as under 16 rider at the British National Track Championships, he represented Great Britain at the 2007 European Youth Olympic Festival, competing in the criterium and road race events. He says  that he was not very good at sports that require coordination as a school-boy and thus this fuelled his desire to continue competing in cycling.

McLay was selected to represent Britain at the Junior European Cyclo-cross Championships in 2008, where he finished last.

In 2009, McLay became a member of British Cycling's Olympic Academy. McLay went on to win the bronze medal in the Madison at the UEC European Track Championships with partner Sam Harrison. He also represented Great Britain at the 2009 Junior UCI Cyclo-cross World Championships.

In 2010 he became World Champion in the Junior World Madison Track Championships, with Simon Yates.

In 2014 he won a stage of the Tour de l'Avenir. He also came seventh in Tour of Britain stages, a strong showing given that sprinters such as Mark Cavendish, Marcel Kittel, Mark Renshaw and Adam Blythe were also competing, although he said that seventh was not a representation of what he could have achieved.

Professional career

Bretagne–Séché Environnement (2015–17)
He signed for the  professional continental team for the 2015 season. He won his first professional victory in Stage 3 of La Tropicale Amissa Bongo. In the first UCI World Tour race of his career, Paris–Nice, McLay came eighth in stage 5.

His second professional win came at the 2016 Grand Prix de Denain, a French 1.HC race, weaving his way from distance through the centre of the bunch to win it on the line. His second win came a month later in the Grand Prix de la Somme, beating Nacer Bouhanni into 2nd place. Due to those two wins, McLay was selected to take part in his first Tour de France, and finished in the Top 10 in his first sprint finish. After another two top 10 finishes, McLay finished on the podium on Stage 6 behind Mark Cavendish and Marcel Kittel.

In October 2017 McLay won the Tour de l'Eurométropole, pipping Anthony Turgis to the line after Turgis started his celebration early following a solo attack from the front group.

EF Education First–Drapac (2018–19)

Major results

Track

2008
 1st  Scratch, National Junior Track Championships
2009
 National Junior Track Championships
1st  Madison (with George Atkins)
1st  Points race
2nd Kilo
3rd Individual pursuit
3rd Scratch
 3rd  Madison, UEC European Junior Track Championships (with Sam Harrison)
2010
 UCI Junior Track Cycling World Championships
1st  Madison (with Simon Yates)
2nd  Team pursuit
 National Junior Track Championships
1st  Scratch
2nd Individual pursuit
 2nd Madison, National Track Championships (with Sam Harrison)

Road

2010
 National Junior Road Championships
1st  Road race
2nd Time trial
 1st  Overall Junior Tour of Wales
 2nd Paris–Roubaix Juniors
 6th Overall Driedaagse van Axel
1st Stage 1
2011
 1st Grand Prix de Waregem
 6th Dorpenomloop Rucphen
2012
 1st De Drie Zustersteden
 1st Grand Prix José Dubois
 2nd Kernen Omloop Echt-Susteren
2013
 2nd Dorpenomloop Rucphen
 4th Time trial, National Under-23 Road Championships
 4th Paris–Chauny
 5th Ster van Zwolle
 5th Textielprijs Vichte
 6th Overall Paris–Arras Tour
2014
 1st  Overall Ronde van Oost-Vlaanderen
1st Stage 2
 Tour de Normandie
1st  Points classification
1st Stage 3
 1st Stage 3 Tour de l'Avenir
 2nd Dorpenomloop Rucphen
 3rd Time trial, National Under-23 Road Championships
 4th Overall Paris–Arras Tour
1st Stage 3
 5th Grand Prix de la ville de Pérenchies
 7th Paris–Tours Espoirs
 10th Beaumont Trophy
2015
 1st Otley Grand Prix
 1st Stage 3 La Tropicale Amissa Bongo
 6th Brussels Cycling Classic
 7th Paris–Bourges
 8th Overall Tour de Picardie
 8th Velothon Berlin
2016
 1st Grand Prix de Denain
 1st Grand Prix de la Somme
 4th Grand Prix d'Isbergues
 5th Overall Tour de Picardie
 10th Overall Boucles de la Mayenne
 10th Scheldeprijs
2017
 1st Tour de l'Eurométropole
 1st Trofeo Playa de Palma
 3rd Trofeo Felanitx–Ses Salines–Campos–Porreres
2018
 1st Stage 4 Circuit de la Sarthe
2019
 1st Stage 1 Herald Sun Tour
 1st Stage 2 Tour of Guangxi
2020
 Volta a Portugal
1st Stages 5 & 6
 8th Bretagne Classic
2021
 2nd Ronde van Limburg
 6th Paris–Bourges
 7th Elfstedenronde
 8th Overall Boucles de la Mayenne
 9th Circuit de Wallonie
2022
 4th Kuurne–Brussels–Kuurne
 4th Heistse Pijl
 7th Scheldeprijs

Grand Tour general classification results timeline

References

External links
 
 
 
 
 
 

1992 births
Living people
British male cyclists
Sportspeople from Leicester
Sportspeople from Wellington City